From Me to U is the debut studio album by American rapper Juelz Santana. The album was released on August 19, 2003 as planned, under Diplomat, Roc-A-Fella and Def Jam. The album was seen as the introspective introduction of the rapper to mainstream entertainment. Following appearances on various street mixtapes and the success of The Diplomats, Santana was the second member of the group to release a solo album, after de facto leader Cam'ron.

From Me to U was the second official album to be released while the super group was signed to Diplomat Records, a sublabel of Roc-A-Fella Records at the time, following Cam'ron's Roc-A-Fella debut Come Home with Me. Upon its release in 2003, after one year of recording and mastering, the 20-tracked album found commercial success, reaching #8 on the Billboard 200 and #3 on the Top R&B/Hip-Hop Albums, even though it did not receive critical acclaim throughout the industry. Though some tracks originally were featured on Juelz's street mixtape Final Destination, they were still applied to the track listing of the official album as well.

Commercial performance
The album debuted at number 8 on the Billboard 200 selling 74,000 copies in its first week.

Track listing
Credits adapted from the album's liner notes.

Sample credits
 "One Day I Smile" contains a sample of "Mr. Heartbreak", written by Grenville Harding, as performed by The Delegation.
 "Okay Okay" contains a sample of "Trying to Make a Fool of Me", written by Thomas Bell and William Hart, as performed by The Delfonics.
 "Down" contains a sample of "I'm Going Down", written by Norman Whitfield, as performed by Mary J. Blige.
 "Monster Music" contains an interpolation of "Making Love Out of Nothing at All", written by Jim Steinman.
 "Back Again" contains a sample of "You're Special", written by Harold Hudson and William King, as performed by The Commodores.
 "My Problem (Jealousy)" contains a sample of "Jealousy", written by Harold Payne, Mike Scarpiello, and Ed Pease, as performed by Vickie Sue Robinson.
 "How I Feel" contains a sample of "Woman to Woman", written by James Banks, Eddie Marion, and Henderson Thigpen Jr., as performed by Shirley Brown.
 "Why" contains a sample of "Can U Help Me", written by James Harris III, Terry Lewis, and Usher Raymond, as performed by Usher.
 "Dipset (Santana's Town)" contains a sample from "Anvil Chorus", performed by The Chicago Symphony and Chorus.
 "Squalie" contains a sample of "I Love You So, Never Gonna Let You Go", written by Barry White, as performed by The Love Unlimited Orchestra.
 "Rain Drops" contains a sample of "Nights Like This", written by Jesse W. Johnson and Keith D. Lewis, as performed by After 7.
 "My Love (Remix)" contains a sample of "Look What You've Done", written by James Ingram, as performed by The Moments.
 "Let's Go" contains a sample from "Let's Get It On", written by Marvin Gaye and Ed Townsend, as performed by Marvin Gaye.
 "This Is for My Homies" contains a sample from "Gangsta Lean", written by Tracy Carter, Chris Jackson, Taura Stinson, Milton Turner Jr., as performed by DRS.

Charts

Weekly charts

Year-end charts

References

2003 debut albums
Juelz Santana albums
Albums produced by Jazze Pha
Def Jam Recordings albums
Roc-A-Fella Records albums
Diplomat Records albums
Albums produced by the Heatmakerz